Marcos Zurinaga (September 6, 1952 in San Juan, Puerto Rico) is a Puerto Rican film director, screenwriter and cinematographer.

Biography 
His late mother was UPR professor Rosa Zurinaga. He studied at the UPR Elementary School, University High School (UHS) and obtained his B.A. at UPR in 1972. He joined Puerto Rican filmmaker Roberto Gándara upon graduation, setting aside plans to study a master's degree, founding the film company Zaga Films. Among the several movies that he has directed is La Gran Fiesta, a movie about the last grand party at the "Casino de Puerto Rico" building in Old San Juan, before it was turned over to military use as the United States was drawn into World War II, and A Step Away, a 1980 critically acclaimed movie narrated by Orson Welles. In 1996 came an unusual movie in Zurinaga's filmography, the thriller-mystery film The Disappearance of Garcia Lorca.

Filmography 
 Siempre estuvimos aquí (director) 1977
 Alicia Alonso y el ballet Nacional de Cuba (16 mm, color, 90 mins. Director) 1979
 A Step Away (35 mm, color, 120 mins. Director. Roberto Ponce Producer) 1980
 La Gran Fiesta (35 mm, color, 100 mins. Director, Producer and screenwriter) 1985
 Tango Bar (35 mm, color. Director, Producer and Screenwriter) 1987
 A flor de piel (35 mm, color, 80 mins. Director) 1990
 Puerto Rico (70 mm, color, 15 mins. Director and Producer) 1992
 Un pueblo que canta-a Banco Popular de Puerto Rico Christmas special (Video. Director) 1994
 El espíritu de un pueblo-a Banco Popular de Puerto Rico Christmas special (Video. Director) 1995
 Somos un solo pueblo-a Banco Popular de Puerto Rico Christmas special (Video. Director) 1996
 The Disappearance of Garcia Lorca (35 mm, color. Director, Screenwriter and Producer) 1996
 Siempre Piel Canela (Video. Director) 1998
 Mariela y otras historias Director. Caesar Osiris 2010

References 

Puerto Rican film directors
Living people
Year of birth missing (living people)